Asgarabad or Asgar Abad may refer to:

 Əsgərabad, Azerbaijan
 Asgarabad, East Azerbaijan, Iran
 Asgarabad, Fars, Iran
 Asgarabad, Gilan, Iran
 Asgarabad, alternate name of Ezzatabad, Gilan, Gilan Province, Iran
 Asgarabad, Hamadan, Iran
 Asgarabad, Mazandaran, Iran
 Asgarabad, Nishapur, Razavi Khorasan Province, Iran
 Asgarabad, Quchan, Razavi Khorasan Province, Iran
 Asgarabad, Tehran, Iran
 Asgarabad, Khoy, West Azerbaijan Province, Iran
 Asgarabad, Miandoab, West Azerbaijan Province, Iran
 Asgarabad-e Kuh, Urmia County, West Azerbaijan Province, Iran
 Asgarabad Tappeh, Urmia County, West Azerbaijan Province, Iran
 Asgarabad-e Abbasi, Iran

See also
 Asgharabad (disambiguation)
 Askarabad (disambiguation)